Alex Sandro Santana de Oliveira (born 30 October 1973), known as Paulo Isidoro, is a retired Brazilian football player.

Club statistics

References

External links

1973 births
Living people
Brazilian footballers
Brazilian expatriate footballers
Cruzeiro Esporte Clube players
Fluminense FC players
Sociedade Esportiva Palmeiras players
Sport Club Internacional players
América Futebol Clube (RN) players
Fortaleza Esporte Clube players
Esporte Clube Bahia players
Mogi Mirim Esporte Clube players
J1 League players
Kawasaki Frontale players
Association football forwards
Sportspeople from Salvador, Bahia